Portrait of Clarissa Strozzi is a portrait by the Italian painter Titian from 1542 belonging to the Gemäldegalerie in Berlin.

The painting depicts a girl from the old Florentine family of Strozzi. The girl seems slightly frightened and holds onto her little Phalene dog. By some it is considered an example of one of the most beautiful child portraits in the world thanks to colouring and specifically the combination of colours carmine red, blue and golden yellow. This canvas is considered an inspiration for similar paintings by Anthony van Dyck.

References 

 
 R. Bergerhoff, Tycjan, Warszawa: Arkady, 1979. HPS, 2007, .
 W. Mole, Tycjan, Warszawa: Arkady, 1958

Strozzi, Clarissa
1542 paintings